My Time may refer to:

Music 
 My Time (album), by Boz Scaggs

Songs 
 "My Time", song from Boz Scaggs album My Time (album)
 "My Time" (Fabolous song), 2009
 "My Time", by Jungkook of BTS, from the album Map of the Soul: 7, 2020
 "My Time", by The Psychedelic Furs, from the album Mirror Moves
 "My Time", by Jim Johnston and Chris Warren, the entrance song of professional wrestler Triple H, from the album WWF The Music, Vol. 4
 "My Time", by Bo En from the album Pale Machine (2013) and the video game Omori (2020)

See also 
 Time (disambiguation)
 Wasting My Time (disambiguation)